Jim Chasey is a former American football quarterback who played two seasons in the Canadian Football League with the Montreal Alouettes and Toronto Argonauts. He played college football at Dartmouth College.

College career
Chasey played college football for the Dartmouth Big Green. He helped Dartmouth to a share of the Ivy League championship in 1969 and helped the Big Green to an undefeated season and the Ivy League championship his senior year in 1970. He was also named an "All Ivy" All Star and an "All East" All Star in 1970. Chasey recorded 2,391 yards on 14 passing touchdowns during his college career. He also played baseball for the Dartmouth Big Green in 1969.

Professional career

Montreal Alouettes
Chasey signed with the Montreal Alouettes in 1971 and started for them his first season before suffering an injury. He served as backup quarterback in 1972 and was released by the team on August 7, 1972 to make room for quarterback George Mira.

Toronto Argonauts
Chasey was signed by the Toronto Argonauts in 1972 and was released by the Argonauts later in the 1972 season.

References

External links
Just Sports Stats
College stats

Living people
Year of birth missing (living people)
Players of American football from San Jose, California
Players of Canadian football from San Jose, California
American football quarterbacks
Canadian football quarterbacks
American players of Canadian football
Dartmouth Big Green football players
Dartmouth Big Green baseball players
Montreal Alouettes players
Toronto Argonauts players